Eucalyptus oreades, commonly known as the Blue Mountains ash, white ash or smooth-barked mountain ash, is a species of medium-sized to tall tree that is native to eastern Australia. It has smooth, powdery whitish bark with rough bark near the base, lance-shaped to curved adult leaves, flower buds in groups of seven, white flowers and cup-shaped to cylindrical fruit.

Description
Flowering occurs from January to March and the flowers are white.

Taxonomy and naming
Eucalyptus oreades was first formally described in 1900 by Richard Thomas Baker in the Proceedings of the Linnean Society of New South Wales from specimens Baker and Henry George Smith collected at Adelina Falls near Lawson in the Blue Mountains on 22 April 1899. The species name is derived from Oreades, Greek mountains nymphs, referring to the habitat of this species.

Distribution and habitat
Blue Mountains ash occurs from Mittagong in the Southern Highlands north to Binna Burra and Springbrook in far south-eastern Queensland. It is widespread in the Blue Mountains, with a somewhat scattered distribution elsewhere. It is found on sandstone soils in the Blue Mountains, and red clay loams elsewhere. The habitat is open eucalypt forest, and associated species include silvertop ash (E. sieberi), narrow-leaved peppermint (E. radiata), broad-leaved peppermint (E. dives), Sydney peppermint (E. piperita), Blaxland's stringybark (E. blaxlandii), snappy gum (E. racemosa), messmate stringybark (E. obliqua), tallowwood (E. microcorys), and New England blackbutt (E. andrewsii).

Ecology
Eucalyptus oreades is unusual for a eucalypt in that it lacks a lignotuber and therefore is sensitive to bushfire, and often succumbs, with recruitment coming from the seeds stored in the canopy seedbank. Mature trees over 20 years of age do have a skirt of thicker corky bark which helps them resist low-intensity fires.

Uses
Very fast growing in cultivation, Eucalyptus oreades is grown in plantations for timber, both in Australia and overseas in New Zealand and South Africa.

Gallery

References

oreades
Flora of Queensland
Flora of New South Wales
Drought-tolerant trees
Myrtales of Australia
Trees of Australia
Trees of mild maritime climate
Plants described in 1900
Taxa named by Richard Thomas Baker